Vetluga is a town and the administrative center of Vetluzhsky District in Nizhny Novgorod Oblast, Russia, located on the right bank of the Vetluga River. Population:

History
It was founded in 1636 and granted town status in 1778.

Administrative and municipal status
Within the framework of administrative divisions, Vetluga serves as the administrative center of Vetluzhsky District. As an administrative division, it is incorporated within Vetluzhsky District as the town of district significance of Vetluga. As a municipal division, the town of district significance of Vetluga is incorporated within Vetluzhsky Municipal District as Vetluga Urban Settlement.

Notable residents 

Aleksey Pisemsky (1821–1881), novelist and dramatist, lived his first ten years at Vetluga
Vasily Rozanov (1856–1919), writer and philosopher, born in Vetluga
Viktor Rozov (1913–2004), dramatist and screenwriter, received primary education at Vetluga from 1918

Climate

References

Notes

Sources

Cities and towns in Nizhny Novgorod Oblast
Vetluzhsky District
Vetluzhsky Uyezd